Scenedesmaceae is a family of green algae in the order Sphaeropleales.  Scenedesmus algae are commonly found in freshwater plankton. The former family Coelastraceae is considered a synonym of Scenedesmaceae.

Genera 
Genera in this family include:

 Acutodesmus
 Asterarcys
 Astrocladium
 Chodatodesmus
 Closteriococcus
 Coelastrella
 Coelastropsis
 Coelastrum
 Comasiella
 Crucigeniopsis
 Danubia
 Desmodesmus
 Dimorphococcus
 Enallax
 Flechtneria
 Gilbertsmithia
 Hariotina
 Hofmania
 Hylodesmus
 Komarekia
 Lauterborniella
 Neodesmus
 Pectinodesmus
 Pseudodidymocystis
 Pseudotetrastrum
 Scenedesmus
 Schistochilium
 Schmidledesmus
 Schroederiella
 Scotiellopsis
 Soropediastrum
 Staurogenia
 Steinedesmus
 Tetradesmus
 Tetrallantos
 Tetranephris
 Tetrastrum
 Truncatulus
 Verrucodesmus
 Westella
 Westellopsis
 Willea
 Yadavaea

References

External links

Chlorophyceae families
Sphaeropleales